Jean-Claude Guillebaud (born 21 May 1944 in Algiers) is a French writer, essayist, lecturer and journalist.

Biography 
A journalist at the daily Sud Ouest, then at the newspaper Le Monde and the weekly Le Nouvel Observateur, Jean-Claude Guillebaud also directed the organisation Reporters Without Borders. In 1972 he was the recipient of the Prix Albert-Londres. 
In 2005, Guillebaud published . He kept a weekly column on the life of the media in the television supplement of Le Nouvel Observateur before replacing Jacques Julliard as columnist at Le Nouvel Observateur from November 2010. He also keeps a chronicle of observation of French society and politics in the Catholic weekly La Vie. Since June 2008, he has been a member of the supervisory board of the press group Bayard Presse.

In 2016, he presided the 23rd Prix Bayeux-Calvados des correspondants de guerre.

Writings 
1969: Chaban-Delmas ou l'art d'être heureux en politique, Éditions Grasset
1974: Les Jours terribles d'Israël, Éditions du Seuil
1976: Les Confettis de l'Empire, Seuil
1978: Les Années orphelines, 1968-1978, Seuil
1980: Un voyage vers l'Asie, Seuil
1980: Un voyage en Océanie, Seuil
1988: Le Voyage à Kéren, Arléa, Prix Roger Nimier 
1993: La Colline des Anges : Retour au Viêt Nam with Raymond Depardon, Seuil
1995: La Trahison des Lumières : enquête sur le désarroi contemporain, Seuil, Jean-Jacques Rousseau 
1998: La Tyrannie du plaisir, Seuil, Prix Renaudot Essai 
1999: La Refondation du monde, Seuil, 
2001: Le Principe d'humanité, Seuil, 
2002: L'Esprit du lieu, Arléa
2003: Le Goût de l'avenir, Seuil, 
2005: La force de conviction : à quoi pouvons-nous croire ?, Seuil, 
2007: Comment je suis redevenu chrétien, Seuil, 
2007: Figures à Cordouan by Pierre-Henri Simon, preface, Le Croît Vif
2009: La confusion des valeurs, 
2008: Le Commencement d'un monde, Seuil, 
2010: Sont-ils morts pour rien ? : Un demi-siècle d'assassinats politiques, with Jean Lacouture, Seuil 
2011: La vie vivante, Éditions Les Arènes, 
2011: Le Goût de l'avenir, Seuil, 
2011: Le Deuxième Déluge, Éditions Desclée de Brouwer, 
2012: Une autre vie est possible, Éditions L'iconoclaste, 
2013: Je n'ai plus peur, Éditions L'iconoclaste, 
2016: Le tourment de la guerre, Éditions L'iconoclaste

References

External links 
 Jean-Claude Guillebaud on the site of l'Obs
 Jean-Claude Guillebaud : «Il faut réapprendre à penser la guerre  on Le Monde
 Jean-Claude Guillebaud on France Inter
 Jean-Claude Guillebaud on Académie d'Angoumois
 Jean-Claude Guillebaud : Sur la guerre, nos dirigeants sont dans la grandiloquence effrayée on L'Opinion

1944 births
Living people
People from Algiers
People of French Algeria
Pieds-Noirs
20th-century French writers
21st-century French writers
French Roman Catholic writers
20th-century French journalists
21st-century French journalists
French war correspondents
Roger Nimier Prize winners
Albert Londres Prize recipients
Joseph Kessel Prize recipients